Maritime mobile-satellite service (MMSS, or maritime mobile-satellite radiocommunication service) is – according to Article 1.29 of the International Telecommunication Union's Radio Regulations (RR) – "A mobile-satellite service in which mobile earth stations are located on board ships; survival craft stations and emergency position-indicating radiobeacon stations may also participate in this service", in addition to serving as navigation systems.

Classification
This radiocommunication service is classified in accordance with ITU Radio Regulations (article 1) as follows: 
Mobile service
Maritime mobile service (article 1.28)
Maritime mobile-satellite service
Port operations service (article 1.30)
Ship movement service (article 1.31)

Frequency allocation
The allocation of radio frequencies is provided according to Article 5 of the ITU Radio Regulations (edition 2012).

In order to improve harmonisation in spectrum utilisation, the majority of service-allocations stipulated in this document were incorporated in national Tables of Frequency Allocations and Utilisations which is with-in the responsibility of the appropriate national administration. The allocation might be primary, secondary, exclusive, and shared.
primary allocation:  is indicated by writing in capital letters
secondary allocation: is indicated by small letters
exclusive or shared utilization: is within the responsibility of administrations

 Example of frequency allocation

Selection of MMSS stations

See also
 Radio station
 Radiocommunication service

References / sources 

Mobile services ITU
Maritime communication